N,N-Dibutyltryptamine (DBT) is a psychedelic drug belonging to the tryptamine family.  It is found either as its crystalline hydrochloride salt or as an oily or crystalline base. DBT was first synthesized by the chemist Alexander Shulgin and reported in his book TiHKAL (Tryptamines i Have Known And Loved). Shulgin did not test DBT himself, but reports a human dosage of "1 mg/kg i.m." being active, but less so than DMT or DET. This suggests that an active dosage of DBT will be in the 100 mg range. This compound has been sold as a "research chemical" and has been confirmed to be an active hallucinogen although somewhat weaker than other similar tryptamine derivatives. It produces a head-twitch response in mice.

There are four symmetrical isomers of DBT which can be made, or ten isomers in total if unsymmetrical substitution is used. Of these only the n-butyl analogue DBT is known to be active in humans; the isobutyl, sec-butyl, and tert-butyl isomers DIBT, DSBT and DTBT have never been tested and only DBT and DIBT were made by Shulgin.

The unsymmetrical isomers BIBT, BSBT, BTBT, IBSBT, IBTBT and SBTBT are also possible but have never been made and no predictions have been made about their activity. Shulgin speculates that the s-butyl isomer DSBT may be more potent than the straight chain compound DBT, but that the more highly branched DIBT and DTBT would probably be inactive due to the bulk of the substituent group. As for longer chain compounds than butyl, they have not been made and would probably be inactive. Shulgin mentions that the monohexyl compound NHT is without activity. However the unsymmetrical compounds such as methylbutyltryptamine show more promise, and a wide range of possible compounds could be made by pairing the various butyl isomers with methyl, ethyl, propyl, isopropyl or allyl groups

See also
 4-HO-DSBT
 5-MeO-DBT

References

External links
 TiHKAL entry

Psychedelic tryptamines